The 2012–13 Wisconsin Badgers men's basketball team represented the University of Wisconsin–Madison during the 2012–13 NCAA Division I men's basketball season. This was Bo Ryan's 12th season as head coach at Wisconsin. The Badgers played their home games at the Kohl Center and were members of the Big Ten Conference. They finished the season 23–12, 12–6 in Big Ten play to tie for fourth place. The team advanced to the championship game of the 2013 Big Ten tournament where it lost to Ohio State. Wisconsin received an at-large bid to the 2013 NCAA tournament where the team lost in the second round to Ole Miss.

2012 Commitments

Awards
All-Big Ten by Media
 Bo Ryan - Coach of the Year
 Jarred Berggren - 2nd team
 Ben Brust - Honorable mention
 Sam Dekker - Honorable mention

All-Big Ten by Coaches
 Bo Ryan - Coach of the Year
 Jarred Berggren - 2nd team & All-Defensive team
 Ben Brust - Honorable mention
 Sam Dekker - All-Freshman team

Roster

Schedule and results
Source

|-
!colspan=12| Exhibition

|-
!colspan=12| Regular Season		

|-
!colspan=12| Big Ten tournament	

|-
!colspan=12| NCAA tournament

Rankings

Player statistics

As of March 23, 2013

		        MINUTES    |--TOTAL--|   |--3-PTS--| |-F-THROWS-| |---REBOUNDS---|                 |-SCORING-| 
## Player           GP GS Tot  Avg  FG  FGA  Pct  3FG 3FA Pct FT FTA  Pct  Off Def Tot Avg PF FO  A TO Blk Stl Pts Avg 
01 Brust, Ben       35 35 1200 34.3 140 330 .424  79 203 .389  29  43 .674  41 139 180 5.1 47  1  79  40  2 34 388 11.1
40 Berggren, Jared  35 35  999 28.5 145 308 .471  21  83 .253  73 104 .702  88 154 242 6.9 53  0  30  36 73 20 384 11.0
05 Evans, Ryan      35 35 1017 29.1 144 365 .395   2  24 .083  63 148 .426  71 186 257 7.3 64  1  70  55 28 26 353 10.1
15 Dekker, Sam      35  3  780 22.3 118 247 .478  50 128 .391  49  71 .690  43  75 118 3.4 43  0  47  37 14 23 335  9.6
12 Jackson, Traevon 35 29  973 27.8  84 226 .372  22  75 .293  52  68 .765  16  72  88 2.5 75  1  99  73  6 35 242  6.9
31 Bruesewitz, Mike 33 30  923 28.0  71 177 .401  30 106 .283  38  55 .691  52 123 175 5.3 84  4  60  48  9 29 210  6.4
44 Kaminsky, Frank  32  2  329 10.3  43  98 .439  14  45 .311  33  43 .767  21  35  56 1.8 40  0  26   9 17 14 133  4.2
03 Marshall, George 35  6  552 15.8  49 138 .355  35  95 .368  10  16 .625   3  22  25 0.7 47  0  35  18  0  7 143  4.1
33 Showalter, Zak   22  0  147  6.7  11  29 .379   2  10 .200  13  19 .684  13  10  23 1.0 18  0  12   8  1  7  37  1.7
10 Fahey, Dan       10  0   28  2.8   3   6 .500   0   1 .000   5   6 .833   2   4   6 0.6  0  0   2   2  1  1  11  1.1
34 Bohannon, Zach   17  0   80  4.7   7  15 .467   2   5 .400   1   6 .167   9  14  23 1.4  6  0   2   3  2  2  17  1.0
32 Anderson, Evan   12  0   38  3.2   4   7 .571   0   1 .000   1   1 1.000  0   2   2 0.2 10  0   2   3  0  1   9  0.8
02 Smith, Jordan    10  0   21  2.1   3  10 .300   1   7 .143   0   0 .000   2   2   4 0.4  2  0   1   0  0  0   7  0.7
22 Wise, J.D.        9  0   13  1.4   1   3 .333   1   1 1.000  2   2 1.000  0   3   3 0.3  2  0   0   2  0  1   5  0.6
   Team                                                                    45  40  85       0      8 
   Total..........  35  7100  823 1959 .420 259 784 .330 369 582 .634 406 881 1287 36.8 491  7 465  342 153 200 2274 65.0
   Opponents......  35  7100  744 1890 .394 136 470 .289 334 485 .689 325 838 1168 33.2 605 15 300  392  85 198 1958 55.9

References

Wisconsin Badgers men's basketball seasons
Wisconsin
Wisconsin
Wisconsin Badgers men's basketball
Wisconsin Badgers men's basketball